Jenny Lin is a Taiwanese-born American pianist.

Life 
She was born in Taiwan, and raised in Austria and the United States. She began her piano studies at the age of 4. At age 10, she was accepted into the Hochschule für Musik in Vienna, Austria, in the studio of Noel Flores. At age 14, she immigrated to the United States, attended the National Cathedral School in Washington, D.C., and Peabody Conservatory of Music in Baltimore, studying with Julian Martin. She received an Artist Diploma from Peabody and also holds a bachelor's degree in German Literature from Johns Hopkins University. After college, she moved to Geneva, Switzerland, to study with the pianist Dominique Weber. She has also worked with Richard Goode and Blanca Uribe in New York, and with Leon Fleisher, Dimitri Bashkirov and Andreas Staier at the Fondazione Internazionale per il pianoforte in Cadenabbia, Italy.

Recordings and Film 
Lin's discography includes recordings on Hänssler Classic, Steinway & Sons, Koch/E1, BIS Records, Albany Records and Sunrise Records. Albums include the 24 Preludes and Fugues Op. 87 by Dmitri Shostakovitch, "Silent Music" featuring Federico Mompou's Musica Callada, "The 11th Finger", piano works by Valentin Silvestrov, piano works by Ruth Crawford Seeger, "InsomniMania", "Chinoiserie", music for Piano and Orchestra by Ernest Bloch, Ma Shui-Long Piano Concerto, Xavier Montsalvatge's Concerto Breve with NDR Radiophilharmonie, complete Piano Etudes of Philip Glass, complete Nocturnes of Chopin and complete piano music of Artur Schnabel.

Composers 
Composers who have written for Lin and whose works she has premiered include Steve Antosca, Jonathan Bepler, Timothy Beyer, Luc Brewaeys, Gerald Busby, Uri Caine, Unsuk Chin, Boudewijn Cox, Cornelius Dufallo, Daniel Felsenfeld, Elena Firsova, Luca Francesconi, Jason Freeman, Vivian Fung, Stefano Gervasoni, Marc-Andre Hamelin, Robert Helps, Huang Ruo, Vincent Ho, Ethan Iverson, Laura Kaminsky, Arthur Kampela, John King, Stefan Malzew, Jeffrey Mumford, Randy Nordschow, Gabriela Ortiz, John Psathas, Jim Pugliese, Frederic Rzewski, Elliott Sharp, Valentin Silvestrov, Salvatore Sciarrino, Johannes Maria Staud, James Tenney.

Among her activities, she has collaborated with Jazz pianist Chris Wiesendanger, Uri Caine, Ethan Iverson, avant-garde guitarist Marc Ribot, trombonist George Lewis, and Wilco members Nels Cline and Glenn Kotche.

Since 2014, she has joined Philip Glass in his ongoing world tour of his complete Piano Etudes.

Personal life
Lin lives in New York City. She is on the faculty at the 92nd Street Y, where she teaches private lessons as well as the class "A History of Piano Etudes".

Discography 
 Giya Kancheli: Simple Music (2021 Steinway & Sons)
 Frederic Chopin: complete Piano Nocturnes (2018 Steinway & Sons)
 Artur Schnabel: complete Piano Music (2018 Steinway & Sons)
 Philip Glass: complete Piano Etudes (2018 Steinway & Sons)
 Sergei Prokofiev and Kirill Zaborov: piano solo works (2017 Steinway & Sons)
 "Melody's Mostly Musical Day" (2016 Steinway & Sons)
 "The Spirio Sessions" 2-piano works with Uri Caine (2015 Steinway & Sons)
 Igor Stravinsky Solo Piano Works (2014 Steinway & Sons)
 "Night Stories: Nocturnes" (2014 Hänssler Classic)
 "17 Windows": Music of David Wolfson (2013 Albany Records)
 "Get Happy": Broadway Song Arrangements by pianists (2012 Steinway & Sons)
 Xavier Montsalvatge: Concerto Breve (2011 Hänssler Classic)
 Silent Music: Federico Mompou Musica Callada (2011 Steinway & Sons)
 Ma Shui-Long: Piano Concerto (2010 National Symphony Orchestra of Taiwan)
 Dmitri Shostakovich: Preludes and Fugues Op. 87 (2010 Hänssler Classic)
 "Insomnimania": (2009 Koch/E1)
 Valentin Silvestrov: Chamber Works (2009 Koch/E1)
 Ernest Bloch: works for piano and orchestra (2008 Hänssler Classic)
 "Nostalgia": Valentin Silvestrov Solo Piano works (2007 Hänssler Classic)
 "The Eleventh Finger": (2007 Koch/E1)
 "Preludes to a Revolution": Russian Piano Preludes (1905–22) (2006 Hänssler Classic)
 Ma Yo-Dao: Piano Suite (2006 Poem Culture Records)
Ruth Crawfold Seeger: Complete Piano Works (2005 BIS Records)
 Guan Xia: Piano Suite (2004 Poem Culture Records)
 "Chinoiserie": (2002 BIS Records)
 Liszt Sonata and Schumann Fantasie: (2000 Sunrise Records)

See also 
 Chinese people in New York City
 Taiwanese people in New York City

References

External links 
 Jenny Lin Official Website

Living people
American women classical pianists
American classical pianists
Johns Hopkins University alumni
José Iturbi International Piano Competition prize-winners
Taiwanese classical pianists
Taiwanese emigrants to the United States
National Cathedral School alumni
Peabody Institute alumni
21st-century classical pianists
21st-century American women pianists
21st-century American pianists
Year of birth missing (living people)